Elena Vesnina and Bruno Soares were the defending champions, but Vesnina chose not to participate this year. Soares played alongside Kateřina Siniaková, but the team withdrew before their second round match against Elina Svitolina and Chris Guccione.

Abigail Spears and Juan Sebastián Cabal won the title, beating Sania Mirza and Ivan Dodig in the final, 6–2, 6–4.

Seeds

Draw

Finals

Top half

Bottom half

References
 Main Draw

External links
 2017 Australian Open – Doubles draws and results at the International Tennis Federation

Mixed Doubles
Australian Open (tennis) by year – Mixed doubles